Buckram is a stiff cotton (occasionally linen or  horse hair) cloth with a loose weave, often muslin.  The fabric is soaked in a sizing agent such as wheat-starch paste, glue (such as PVA glue), or  pyroxylin (gelatinized nitrocellulose, developed around 1910), then dried.  When rewetted or warmed, it can be shaped to create durable firm fabric for book covers, hats, and elements of clothing.

In the Middle Ages, "bokeram" (as the word was sometimes spelt in Middle English) designated a fine cotton cloth, not stiff. The etymology of the term remains uncertain; the Oxford English Dictionary calls into question the commonly-mentioned derivation from the name of the city of Bokhara.

Use in bookbinding
In bookbinding, buckram has several attractive qualities.  In addition to being highly durable, buckram does not allow the bookbinder's paste to seep through and cause discoloration or stains on the book's front and back covers.

In bookbinding, pyroxylin-impregnated fabrics are considered superior to starch-filled fabrics because their surfaces are more water resistant, they are more resistant to insects and fungi, and they are generally stronger. They wear well and are particularly suitable for use in library binding where many people will be repeatedly handling the same books. Pyroxylin also allows for unique decorative effects on book covers. They, too, are water repellant and immune to insect attack and fungi, but they do not wear as well as starch impregnated cloths because of cracking at the joints and occasional peeling of the coating.

Use in millinery
Millinery buckram is impregnated with a starch which allows it to be softened in water, pulled over a hat block, and left to dry into a hard shape. Millinery buckram comes in many weights, including lightweight or baby buckram (often used for children's and dolls' hats), single-ply buckram, and double buckram (also known as theatrical buckram or crown buckram).

References

External links
 US patent US1712991A, Method for preparing buckram

Woven fabrics